José Ignacio Rivero Segade  (born 10 April 1992) is a Uruguayan professional footballer who plays as a midfielder for Liga MX club Cruz Azul.

Honours
Cruz Azul
 Liga MX: Guardianes 2021
 Campeón de Campeones: 2021
Supercopa de la Liga MX: 2022

References

External links
 
 José Ignacio Rivero Presentado con Xolos 

Living people
1992 births
Uruguayan footballers
Uruguayan expatriate footballers
Argentine Primera División players
Liga MX players
Central Español players
Defensa y Justicia footballers
Club Tijuana footballers
Cruz Azul footballers
Expatriate footballers in Argentina
Expatriate footballers in Mexico
Association football midfielders